Ayala Malls Trinoma (stylized as TriNoma, abbreviated from the first syllables of each word of "Triangle North of Manila") is a large shopping mall in Quezon City, Philippines, owned by property development firm Ayala Land. Opened on May 16, 2007, the mall is located on the east side of Epifanio de los Santos Avenue in Quezon City, giving significant market competition to the nearby SM City North EDSA as one of the largest malls in Metro Manila. It is also one of two malls that will be serving Ayala Land's Vertis North township, which is located beside the mall, along with a new lifestyle block mall Ayala Malls Vertis North, similar to Greenbelt in Makati, which was also developed by Ayala Malls.

History
The site of Trinoma used to be the location of "People's Park", a flea market built by former Mayor Brigido Simon Jr. as a livelihood project for the city's nearby informal settlers (the actual market's size, though, only covered what is now Trinoma's public transportation terminal and outdoor pay parking). The park was opened at the time of Corazon Aquino's presidency. It was closed in 1995 by then-Mayor Ismael Mathay Jr. to give way for the construction of the Line 3 depot to service commuters along Epifanio de los Santos Avenue (EDSA).

The Line 3 consortium composed of Fil-Estate Holdings and Ayala Land decided to make the depot underground rather than a regular depot similar to Line 1 due to its commercial viability as a shopping mall. When the Line 3 began operations in December 1999, the construction of the mall was not immediately undertaken due to lack of funding. The North Triangle Depot Commercial Corporation was incorporated in 2001 with Fil-Estate spearheading the development and Ayala Land as minority stockholder.

Ayala Land started constructing Trinoma in June 2005 with the retail development initially known as the North Triangle Commercial
Center or North Triangle Mall. The name of the mall was later changed to "Trinoma" inspired by the redevelopment of industrial district TriBeCa.

Trinoma was officially launched in a private ceremony on April 25, 2007. It was inaugurated by officials of Ayala Land, and authorities of Quezon City, led by then-Mayor Feliciano Belmonte Jr.

According to Ayala Land Inc. president Jaime Ayala, The mall will service all market segments but will specifically cater to Quezon City’s high-end consumers.

The soft opening was originally slated for May 3, 2007, but was delayed by structural elements that were yet to be finished. It finally opened to the public on its soft opening on May 16, 2007. Its grand opening was held on on October 16, 2007, with President Gloria Macapagal Arroyo and Vice President Noli de Castro in attendance.

The mall was the first building constructed in the  Triangle Exchange district of Triangle Park and of Ayala Land's Vertis North project. Vertis North is within the  Quezon City Central Business District (also known as Triangle Park) to redevelop the areas of North Triangle (North Avenue, EDSA, Quezon Avenue), East Triangle (East Avenue, EDSA, Quezon Avenue) and the Veterans Memorial Medical Center (VMMC) property (North Avenue).

The mall's North Avenue Wing will be expanded in line with the construction of the North Triangle Common Station, which will soon connect LRT-1, MRT-3, MRT-7, and the Metro Manila Subway.

Facilities

Trinoma is located at the corner of EDSA and North Avenue in Quezon City. Located in "North Triangle", the mall is bound by three major thoroughfares, namely, North Avenue, EDSA and Mindanao Avenue Extension.

It is directly connected to the North Avenue MRT Station as the mall itself sits atop the Line 3 Depot. It will be also be connected to the future North Triangle Common Station. A pedestrian overpass has also been constructed to connect with SM City North EDSA.

The mall is composed of four major levels with two minor ones on ground and on grade. The mall is characterized by alfresco areas punctuated with water features and landscaping. These water features flow into pools at the Trinoma Park, a green area that sits atop the mall. The Trinoma Park is a two-level park spanning a total of one hectare. It is home to an array of restaurants offering varied cuisines. The Park also houses a stage, surrounded by pools of water, for performances and shows. The Trinoma Park is linked to the mall's third level. The mall has two parking buildings, North Carpark Building and Mindanao Carpark Building, both named after their adjacent avenue. Parking is also available in open areas.

The mall also houses religious facilities. Two Roman Catholic chapels such as the St. Michael the Archangel Chapel and Mary Mother of Hope Chapel are located inside the mall's second floor and at The Landmark's fourth floor, respectively. New Life North Metro, a Born Again Christian church, is located at the ground floor.

Incidents
 In the afternoon of March 13, 2017, a fire broke out in the mall. The fire was first reported at around 2:25 p.m. and was raised to 2nd alarm as of 2:34 pm, according to an update by TxtFire Philippines. FO1 Joan De Luna of the Tandang Sora fire substation said the fire reportedly started at an appliance warehouse near the MRT station. The Bureau of Fire Protection declared fire out at 6:33 p.m.
On January 25, 2020, at around 6:00 p.m, a 15-year-old high school student jumped to his death from the 7th floor of the mall's Mindanao Carpark Building. He was rushed to Veterans Memorial Medical Center but was pronounced dead on arrival.

References

External links
Trinoma Official website

 Trinoma
 Trinoma Restaurants

Shopping malls in Quezon City
Buildings and structures in Quezon City
Tourist attractions in Quezon City
Ayala Malls
Shopping malls established in 2007